"White Unicorn" is a song by Australian hard rock band Wolfmother. Written by band members Andrew Stockdale, Chris Ross and Myles Heskett, it was produced by Dave Sardy for the group's self-titled debut album in 2005. The song was also released as the second single from the album in Australia on 26 February 2006. The track reached number 33 on the Australian Singles Chart and number 29 on the US Billboard Mainstream Rock chart.

Background
"White Unicorn" was one of four songs originally recorded by Wolfmother for the band's self-titled debut EP in 2004, initially under the title "The White Unicorn". It was later re-recorded for the group's self-titled full-length debut the following year and released as the second single from the album on 26 February 2006. The song was backed with "Love Train" and music videos for "Dimension" and "Mind's Eye", all of which had been recently released on the EP Dimensions. The single debuted on the Australian Singles Chart at its peak position of number 33, remaining in the top 50 for three weeks running. Outside of Australia, it was the band's first track to register on the US Billboard Mainstream Rock chart, debuting at number 37, before spending a total of 12 weeks on the chart and peaking at number 29.

Stylistically, "White Unicorn" has been compared to the work of Led Zeppelin by multiple commentators. Adam Webb of Dotmusic claimed that the song "forges its classic axe signature into a Led Zeppelin stomper", while Pitchfork's Cory D. Byrom claimed that "Its opening bars recall Led Zeppelin's gentler side with clean-strummed guitar chords and Stockdale putting on his best Robert Plant". Writers for Rolling Stone and People magazines compared the song's guitar riffs to the work of Zeppelin's Jimmy Page. Sam Shepherd of musicOMH went as far as to claim that the song uses the opening chords to Led Zeppelin's "Ramble On" in its main riff. In a review for Blabbermouth.net, Keith Bergman likened the instrumental breakdown in the middle of the song to The Doors track "Riders on the Storm".

The music video for "White Unicorn" is made up of footage from Wolfmother's performances at Big Day Out and Homebake festivals in 2005, edited by Kris Moyes. According to Steven Gottlieb of VideoStatic, "Most of the camera angles emanate from behind the band to convey just how big these guys are down under, while various color effects give the clip a slight psychedelic feel". Speaking about the lack of a director credit on the video, Moyes claims that "Since I was asked to do this as a favour I decided not to have a producer/director credit". Shortly after the original video's release, a "defaced version" featuring various overlaid sketches was released. The defacing was originally credited to "Bandito Bruce", a 16-year-old Wolfmother fan "with no connection to the band or label". However, Moyes later revealed that he himself had produced the version, noting that he was inspired by the work L.H.O.O.Q., a defaced reproduction of the Mona Lisa by artist Marcel Duchamp.

Reception
In reviews of Wolfmother, some critics praised "White Unicorn" as one of the album's highlights. Writing for the website PopMatters, Adrian Begrand claimed that it "emerges as the clear winner on the entire disc, neatly marrying the hippy-dippy sentiment of Robert Plant and the monstrous chords of Tony Iommi before briefly returning to the acid rock sounds of Hawkwind again". Adam Webb of Dotmusic highlighted the song as the prime example of the band's songwriting ability, while The Observer columnist Ben Thompson recommended it as one of two (alongside "Pyramid") highlights of the record. At the end of 2005, Australian radio station Triple J included "White Unicorn" at number 84 on its Hottest 100 list, the lowest position of the six Wolfmother tracks featured on the list.

Track listing

Personnel
Andrew Stockdale – vocals, guitar
Chris Ross – bass, keyboards
Myles Heskett – drums
Dave Sardy – production, mixing
Ryan Castle – engineering
Cameron Barton – engineering assistance
Pete Martinez – engineering assistance
Andy Brohard – Pro Tools editing
Bernie Grundman – mastering
Frank Frazetta – illustration

Chart positions

References

External links

"White Unicorn" at YouTube (music video)
"White Unicorn" (defaced version) at YouTube (music video)

Wolfmother songs
2005 songs
2006 singles
Modular Recordings singles
Songs written by Andrew Stockdale
Song recordings produced by Dave Sardy